The 2015 Florida Gators soccer team represented the University of Florida soccer program for the 2015 NCAA soccer season.

Schedule

! style="background:#FF4A00;color:white;"| Regular Season
|- valign="top" 

|- bgcolor="#ffffff"
| August 11 || Troy (Exhibition) || || Gainseville, FL || – ||  || 0–0 || 0–0
|- bgcolor="#ffffff"
| August 15 || Florida Gulf Coast || || Gainesville, FL || – ||  || – || 0–0
|- bgcolor="#ddffdd"
| August 21 || at UCF || 8 || Orlando, FL || 2–0 ||  || 1–0 || 0–0
|- bgcolor="#ffffff"
| August 23 || at Ohio State || || Columbus, OH || – ||  || – || 0–0
|- bgcolor="#ffffff"
| August 28 || at Miami || || Coral Gables, FL || – ||  || – || 0–0
|- bgcolor="#ffffff"
| August 30 || Florida State || || Gainesville, FL || – ||  || – || 0–0
|-

|- bgcolor="#ffffff"
| September 4 || Oklahoma State ||  || Gainesville, FL || – ||  || – || 0–0
|- bgcolor="#ffffff"
| September 10 || Texas A&M ||  || Gainesville, FL || – ||  || – || –
|- bgcolor="#ffffff"
| September 13 || at Jacksonville ||  || Jacksonville, FL || – ||  || – || –
|- bgcolor="#ffffff"
| September 18 || Mississippi || || Gainesville, FL || – ||  || – || –
|- bgcolor="#ffffff"
| September 20 || at Florida International || || Miami, FL || – ||  || – || –
|- bgcolor="#ffffff"
| September 25 || at Vanderbilt || || Nashville, TN || – ||  || – || –
|- bgcolor="#ffffff"
| September 27 || at Auburn || || Auburn, AL || – ||  || – || –
|-

|- bgcolor="#ffffff"
| October 2|| Kentucky || || Gainesville, FL || – ||  || – || –
|- bgcolor="#ffffff"
| October 9|| at Tennessee || || Knoxville, TN || – ||  || – || –
|- bgcolor="#ffffff"
| October 11|| LSU || || Gainesville, FL || – ||  || – || –
|- bgcolor="#ffffff"
| October 16|| at Mississippi State || || Starkville, MS || – ||  || – || –
|- bgcolor="#ffffff"
| October 22|| South Carolina || || Gainesville, FL || – ||  || – || –
|- bgcolor="#ffffff"
| October 25|| Arkansas || || Gainesville, FL || – ||  || – || –
|- bgcolor="#ffffff"
| October 29|| at Georgia || || Athens, GA || – ||  || – || –
|-

|-
! style="background:#FF4A00;color:white;"| Postseason
|-

References

Florida Gators
Florida Gators women's soccer seasons
Florida Gators